Case Closed is a Japanese comic and media franchise created by Gosho Aoyama.

Case Closed may also refer to:

 Case Closed (film), a 1988 TV film directed by Dick Lowry
 Case Closed, a 1993 book by Gerald Posner about the assassination of John F. Kennedy
 "Case Closed", a 1995 episode of Walker, Texas Ranger
 "Case Closed", a 2012 song by Little Mix song from DNA
 "Case Closed", a 2015 episode of Bad Judge
 Caso Cerrado, a Spanish-language court show broadcast by Telemundo